The 2010 Buffalo Funds - NAIA Division I men's basketball tournament was held in March at Municipal Auditorium in Kansas City, Missouri. The 73rd annual NAIA basketball tournament featured 32 teams playing in a single-elimination format. In 2010, both Buffalo Funds and the City of Kansas City extended contracts with the NAIA to remain title sponsors and will keep the tournament in Kansas City at Municipal Auditorium until 2013. This was the second year that the Heart of America Conference was the tournament host.

Georgetown College made its 19th straight, and 29th overall tournament appearances, both tournament records. The championship game featured two ranked teams for the first time since 2008. The #3 Bison of Oklahoma Baptist University held of the #13 Cougars of Azusa Pacific University.  Azusa Pacific’s Marshall Johnson grabbed his teammate Dominique Johnson’s 2-point miss with nearly one second left, heaved a 10-foot fade-away; nothing but net. Azusa Pacific thought they had won the game, after review, the horn had sound prior to Johnson's shot giving the Bisons their 2nd NAIA championship since 1966. 2010 was Azusa Pacific 2nd trip to the Championship game. In 2005 they also finished as the National Runner-Up.

Awards and honors
Leading scorer:
Leading rebounder:
Most tournament appearances: Georgetown (KY), 29th of 30, appearances to the NAIA Tournament
Most consecutive tournament appearances: 19th, Georgetown (KY)

Bracket

  * denotes overtime.

See also
2010 NAIA Division I women's basketball tournament
2010 NCAA Division I men's basketball tournament
2010 NCAA Division II men's basketball tournament
2010 NCAA Division III men's basketball tournament
2010 NAIA Division II men's basketball tournament

References

NAIA Men's Basketball Championship
Tournament
NAIA Division I men's basketball tournament
NAIA Division I men's basketball tournament